The Mid-City Transitway is a concept for the use of the right-of-way formerly proposed for the Crosstown Expressway in Chicago, Illinois.  The uses being studied include  a bus-only rapid-transit road (similar to a two-lane road running from McCormick Place north to the Loop), a truck-only bypass around the city center, or a rail rapid transit system (the favored and most feasible of the three primary concepts). 

Feasibility studies began in late 2002 and were commissioned by Richard M. Daley, then mayor of Chicago.

Current studies into the Mid-City Transitway utilize a dormant Beltway Railroad railway embankment just east of Cicero Avenue (Illinois Route 50) and other abandoned rail rights-of-way. The feasibility studies will help determine whether a two or four-lane highway can be built atop the embankment. The study corridor is 22 miles (35.4 km) in length.  , although feasibility studies have largely been completed,  according to published reports, recent economic difficulties in city and state finances have made the initiation of construction on the project increasingly unlikely to proceed within the next seven to ten years.

Proposed junctions

Rapid transit line

Montrose
Irving Park/Milwaukee
Addison
Belmont
Diversey
Fullerton
Armitage
North
Division
Chicago
Lake----Transfer To CTA Green Line
Congress----Transfer To CTA Blue Line
Roosevelt
Cermak----Transfer To CTA Pink Line
35th/Hawthorne
47th
Archer
Midway
67th
Ford City
79th
83rd
Cicero
Pulaski/Southwest
Kedzie
Western
Racine
Halsted
Shields
87th

See also
 Urban Ring Project (MBTA) in Boston, MA

References
 Hinz, G. (2002). Daley Goes Down Crosstown Road. Crain's Chicago Business, November 4, 2002 via Chicago-L.org. Retrieved December 27, 2005.
 McClendon, D. (2004). Expressways. Encyclopedia of Chicago. Retrieved December 27, 2005

External links
 City of Chicago: Mid-City Transitway

Expressways in the Chicago area
Proposed railway lines in Illinois
Richard M. Daley